Andriyashev (masculine) or Andriyasheva (feminine) is a Russian last name, a variant of Adrianov.

People with the last name
Anatoly Andriyashev (1910–2009), Soviet Russian marine biologist

References

Notes

Sources
И. М. Ганжина (I. M. Ganzhina). "Словарь современных русских фамилий" (Dictionary of Modern Russian Last Names). Москва, 2001. 

Russian-language surnames